Gino Peruzzi Lucchetti (born 9 June 1992) is an Argentine professional footballer who plays as a right-back for Alianza Lima.

Club career

Vélez Sársfield
Peruzzi started his professional career playing for Vélez Sársfield, making his debut on 27 November 2011, starting in a 1–1 draw with Colón, in the 2011 Apertura. Although he played his first game as a right winger, Peruzzi has since primarily been deployed as a right full back.

Peruzzi gained recognition after his performances against Santos in the home and away legs of the quarter-finals of the 2012 Copa Libertadores, in which Peruzzi marked and annulled Neymar, despite the fact that his team was eliminated in the penalty shootout.

Although he was mainly a substitute for club captain Fabián Cubero, Peruzzi played 13 games (scoring once) in Vélez' 2012 Inicial winning championship, playing either as right back or right winger. He also helped Vélez win the 2012–13 Superfinal, entering the field during the first half after Cubero was sent off.

Calcio Catania
On 13 August 2013, Calcio Catania officially announced the signing of Peruzzi ahead of the 2013–14 Serie A season. The transfer was reported to be worth 3.4 million euros, plus 700k euros in added taxes. Vélez will also reportedly receive 15% of any future resale of the player.

Peruzzi made his debut for the club on 1 December 2013, in a home defeat against A.C. Milan. In his first season with Catania, the club was relegated to Serie B.

Boca Juniors
In 2015, Peruzzi signed with Boca Juniors.

Nacional
On 2 February 2018, Peruzzi joined Uruguayan club Nacional on loan for the remainder of the 2017–18 season.

Club statistics

Honours
Vélez Sársfield
 Argentine Primera División: 2012 Inicial, 2012–13 Superfinal

Boca Juniors
 Argentine Primera División: 2015, 2016–17
 Copa Argentina: 2015

References

External links
 Profile at Vélez Sársfield's official website 
 Argentine Primera statistics at Fútbol XXI  
  Uruguay's official news agency website 

Living people
1992 births
Argentine footballers
Argentine expatriate footballers
Sportspeople from Córdoba Province, Argentina
Association football fullbacks
Argentine people of Italian descent
Argentina international footballers
Argentine Primera División players
Serie A players
Club Atlético Vélez Sarsfield footballers
Catania S.S.D. players
Boca Juniors footballers
Club Nacional de Football players
San Lorenzo de Almagro footballers
Club Alianza Lima footballers
Argentine expatriate sportspeople in Italy
Argentine expatriate sportspeople in Uruguay
Argentine expatriate sportspeople in Peru
Expatriate footballers in Italy
Expatriate footballers in Uruguay
Expatriate footballers in Peru